Lamperti is the surname of an Italian family of musicians. 

Francesco Lamperti (1811–1892), Italian voice teacher
Giovanni Battista Lamperti (1839–1910), Italian voice teacher, son of Francesco

Italian-language surnames
Italian families